The Federation of British International Schools in Asia (FOBISIA) is a regional federation of leading British International schools in Asia. Founded in 1988 as the Federation of British International Schools in South East Asia (FOBISSEA), FOBISIA aims to promote a British style education system in schools throughout Asia, and gives students the opportunity for collaboration and friendly competition through its annual sporting and musical festivals. A key aim of FOBISIA is also the opportunity for teachers from member schools to attend training workshops.

Members

Brunei
International School Brunei
Jerudong International School

China
British School of Beijing
Dulwich College Beijing
Dulwich College Shanghai
Dulwich College Suzhou
Harrow International School Beijing
Shenzhen College of International Education
The British School of Guangzhou
Yk Pao School Shanghai

Hong Kong
Discovery Bay International School
Kellett School

Indonesia
British School Jakarta

Malaysia
Garden International School
Kinabalu International School
Kolej Tuanku Ja'afar
The International School at ParkCity
Uplands International School of Penang
ELC International School
crescendo-HELP International School

Japan
The British School in Tokyo

Nepal
The British School, Kathmandu

Philippines
British School Manila

Singapore
Dover Court International School
Dulwich College (Singapore)
Tanglin Trust School

South Korea
Dulwich College Seoul
North London Collegiate School Jeju

Taiwan
Taipei European School

Thailand
Bangkok International Preparatory and Secondary School
Bangkok Patana School
British International School, Phuket
 Garden International School, Bangkok
Garden International School, Rayong
Harrow International School
Shrewsbury International School
St. John's International School
The Regent's International School Bangkok
Traill International School

Vietnam
ABC International School
British International School Hanoi
British International School Vietnam

References

External links

International schools in Malaysia
British international schools in China
Federations
International school associations
Private and independent school organizations